Irene Kelley is an American country and bluegrass musician. As a songwriter, she has written for Ricky Skaggs, Alan Jackson, Loretta Lynn, and the Osborne Brothers.

Early life
Kelley is originally from Pennsylvania and in high school sang in a Led Zeppelin cover band. She was asked to leave the group after suggesting the band cover songs from Dolly Parton.

Career
Kelley moved to Nashville, Tennessee in the early 1980s. This was after visiting on her honeymoon in 1983 and discovering the first gathering of the International Bluegrass Music Association. Kelley co-wrote the Ricky Skaggs and Sharon White song "Love Can't Ever Get Better Than This" with Nancy Montgomery. The song peaked at number ten on the Billboard Hot Country Singles chart in 1987 and was awarded Duet of the Year at the Country Music Association Awards that same year. Kelley signed to MCA Records in the late 1980s.

Discography

Albums

Singles

Music videos

References

Living people
American bluegrass musicians
Year of birth missing (living people)
Place of birth missing (living people)
Country musicians from Pennsylvania